The 2008-09 LSU Tigers men's basketball team represented Louisiana State University in the sport of basketball during the 2008-09 college basketball season. The Tigers competed in Division I of the National Collegiate Athletic Association (NCAA) and Southeastern Conference (SEC). They were led by 1st year head coach Trent Johnson, and played their home games at the Pete Maravich Assembly Center on the university's Baton Rouge, Louisiana campus.

Recruiting class

Roster

Schedule

|-
!colspan=9| Regular season

|-
!colspan=9| SEC Tournament

|-

|-
!colspan=9| NCAA Tournament

References

Lsu
Lsu
LSU Tigers basketball seasons
LSU
LSU